is a Japanese rugby union player who plays as a fly-half. He currently plays for Suntory Sungoliath in Japan's domestic Top League. He represented the Sunwolves in the 2017 Super Rugby season.

References

1993 births
Living people
Japanese rugby union players
Rugby union fly-halves
Sunwolves players
Toshiba Brave Lupus Tokyo players
Tokyo Sungoliath players
21st-century Japanese people